Trivandrum Division was an administrative division of the princely state of Travancore. It was composed of eight taluks — Chirayinkir, Kottarakara, Nedumangadu, Neyyattankara, Pattanapuram, Shenkotta, North Trivandrum and South Trivandrum and was administered by a civil servant of rank Diwan Peishkar equivalent to a District Collector in British India. The administrative headquarters were at Trivandrum which was also the seat of the Travancore government and the residence of the Maharajah.

In 1921, the eight taluks of Trivandrum were merged with Southern Division. Since then, the Southern Division was called Trivandrum Division.

See also 
 Northern Division (Travancore)
 Quilon Division
 Southern Division (Travancore)

References 

Divisions of Travancore